The Răcăciuni is a right tributary of the river Siret in Romania. It flows into the Siret near the village Răcăciuni.

References

Rivers of Romania
Rivers of Bacău County